The Governor of Rochester Castle commanded the important castle at Rochester in Kent, England which dominated the Medway estuary and Watling Street. After being badly damaged during the Barons' Wars the castle was completely renovated by King Henry III and put under the control of a series of Governors responsible for its upkeep and security.

List of governors
Source (unless stated otherwise):
 c.1215 William de Albini
1228–1232 Hubert de Burgh, 1st Earl of Kent
1232–1236 Stephen de Segrave
1236–1258 John de Cobham (elder)
1258–1260 Nicholas de Moels
1260–1261 William de Saye
1261– Robert Walerand
1264 Roger de Leybourne
1264–1264 William Sinclair (died 1264)
1266 Simon Morlac (Deputy?)
1270– Bertram de Crioll (younger)
–1274 Robert de Hougham (died 1274)
1275– Robert de Septuans
1280–1300 John de Cobham (younger)
1304 Stephen de Dene
1328 Will Skarlett
1344– Sir John de Cobham, Lord Cobham
1360– John Grey, 3rd Baron Grey of Codnor
1376 Simon de Burgh
1378– John de Newenton
–1389 William Criol
1395–?1400 Sir William Arundel
1400–1413 Richard Arundel 
1413–1472 Thomas Lord Cobham
1486–?1506 Thomas Iden (died 1506) 
1509–?1525 Sir John Marney (died 1525)
1525–1559 Sir Thomas Cheyney
16nn–166n Jonathan Atkins
1663–1668 John Middleton, 1st Earl of Middleton

References

Military history of Kent
Rochester